Jeffrey Lawrence Price (born December 18, 1949) and Peter Stewart Seaman (born October 26, 1951) are an American screenwriting and producing duo whose notable works include Trenchcoat (1983), Who Framed Roger Rabbit (1988), Doc Hollywood (1991), Wild Wild West (1999), How the Grinch Stole Christmas (2000), Last Holiday (2006) and Shrek the Third (2007).

Filmography
Film

Television

References

External links

1949 births
1951 births
American comedy writers
American film producers
American male screenwriters
American television writers
American male television writers
Animation screenwriters
Hugo Award-winning writers
Living people
Screenwriting duos